Alessandro Dal Canto (born 10 March 1975) is an Italian association football manager and a former player who played as a defender. He is currently in charge as manager of Carrarese.

Playing career
Dal Canto started his professional career with Juventus, with whom he played three Serie A games.

He successively joined Vicenza of Serie B, where he played a total 35 matches. He then moved to Torino F.C. for a short time, playing 16 games in the top flight before returning at Vicenza, and then moving to Venezia, where he spent three impressive seasons.

After a short period with Bologna, Dal Canto returned again at Vicenza, where he also had the chance to establish himself at the European level.

The defender was one of the first Italian to play in Eastern Europe, specifically in Russia with Uralan Elista in 2003. This was followed by a fourth and final comeback at Vicenza, with 11 appearances. He then played at Serie B and Serie C1 level with Catanzaro, Perugia, AlbinoLeffe and Treviso.

He was also part of the Padania football selection in the VIVA World Cup 2008.

Coaching career
After retiring as a footballer, Dal Canto took over at Padova, becoming the club's new under-19 youth coach. On 15 March 2011 Dal Canto was appointed temporary head coach of Padova, following the dismissal of head coach Alessandro Calori. In his first game in charge of the first team, he guided Padova to its first away win of the season, defeating Pescara 2–0. Club chairman Marcello Cestaro successively confirmed him as Padova head coach until the end of next season 2011–12.

He then served as head coach of Venezia in the Italian third tier (Lega Pro Prima Divisione, then unified to Lega Pro in 2014), from July 2013 to October 2014.

On 13 June 2018, he was named new head coach of Serie C club Arezzo.

On 4 July 2019, Dal Canto signed to Robur Siena. 

Following Siena's bankruptcy, on 16 September 2020 he was hired by newly relegated Serie C club Livorno.

He was fired on 1 March 2021 following a string of negative results that left Livorno in last place in the league table, in a season that saw the club going through a number of serious financial issues that also led to a five point deduction.

Dal Canto started the 2021–22 Serie C season in charge of Viterbese, but was dismissed on 4 October 2021 after seven games in charge. He was rehired as Viterbese coach on 6 March 2022.

On 11 July 2022 Dal Canto was unveiled as the new head coach of Serie C club Carrarese.

References

External links
Gazzetta profile

1975 births
Living people
People from Castelfranco Veneto
Association football defenders
Italian footballers
Italy youth international footballers
Italian expatriate footballers
Juventus F.C. players
Torino F.C. players
L.R. Vicenza players
Venezia F.C. players
Bologna F.C. 1909 players
U.C. AlbinoLeffe players
FC Elista players
A.C. Perugia Calcio players
U.S. Catanzaro 1929 players
Treviso F.B.C. 1993 players
Serie A players
Serie B players
Russian Premier League players
Expatriate footballers in Russia
Italian expatriate sportspeople in Russia
Italian football managers
UEFA Cup winning players
Mediterranean Games gold medalists for Italy
Competitors at the 1997 Mediterranean Games
Mediterranean Games medalists in football
Calcio Padova managers
Venezia F.C. managers
L.R. Vicenza managers
S.S. Arezzo managers
A.C.N. Siena 1904 managers
U.S. Livorno 1915 managers
Serie C managers
Sportspeople from the Province of Treviso
Footballers from Veneto